The 2004 Chinese Super League is the debut season of the establishment of the Chinese Football Association Super League (中国足球协会超级联赛 or 中超), also known as the Chinese Super League. Sponsored by Siemens Mobile it is the eleventh season of professional association football league and the 43rd top-tier league season in China. The premier football league in China under the auspices of the Chinese Football Association the season started on May 15 and ended December 4 where it was planned that no teams would be relegated at the end of the season.

Promotion and relegation
Teams promoted from 2003 Jia-B League
None

Teams relegated after end of 2003 Jia-A League
Chongqing Lifan (Merged with Yunnan Hongta F.C.)
August 1st
Shaanxi Guoli

Overview
The first Chinese Super League (CSL) season was greeted with great enthusiasm by the media and the FA,  with the decision to create a new top tier league in China made in order to freshen up Chinese football. The previous ten seasons of the old Chinese first division had been successful and had improved the quality of play in China, however, the Chinese Football Association felt that a change was needed to give Chinese Football a further boost.

The decision to create the Chinese Super League was made before the 2003 Chinese season and of the 15 First Division teams competing in the 2003 season, it was decided that 3 would be relegated with no promotion at all from the second tier league. The remaining 12 teams would compete in the inaugural Super League season, which saw Chongqing Lifan remain within the league despite being relegated after they merged with seventh place team Yunnan Hongta.

It was planned that one team would be relegated with two teams to be promoted into the CSL at the end of the season but the relegation was cancelled halfway through and so for the second season the Super League had 14 teams.

Controversy

There were many controversial events during the season including the discovery that some players were betting against their own teams and losing games deliberately. Some referees were also suspected of fixing matches by awarding dubious penalty kicks and handing out cards freely. The most notorious incidents happened during two matches, one game involving Beijing Hyundai and the other Dalian Shide. In their respective matches, the players were unhappy about the referee's decisions and they protested by abandoning the match halfway. The CFA took both incidents seriously and handed out punishments by docking points off the two guilty teams.

Upsets

The season produced one of the biggest upset in Chinese football history. Shenzhen Jianlibao, coached by Zhu Guanghu, was facing financial problems and owed its players several months of salary. However, motivated by their coach, they still managed to finish Champions and even more remarkably, their defence only conceded 13 goals in 22 matches, the least in the league.

Another team causing an upset at the wrong end of the table was Shanghai Shenhua who had been Champions in the previous season and during the 2004 season had played in the prestigious AFC Champions League. However, they played poorly in the 2004 season and finished 3rd from bottom, only 1 point above bottom placed team, Chongqing Lifan. If there had been relegation in the season, Shanghai would have found themselves battling against the drop.

League table

Top scorers

Attendances

League
Total attendance: 1,430,600 
Average attendance: 10,838

Clubs

See also
Chinese Super League
Football in China
Chinese Football Association
Chinese Football Association Jia League
Chinese Football Association Yi League
Chinese FA Cup

References

External links
 Results and table on RSSSF 
 League table at data.sports.sina.com.cn 

Chinese Super League seasons
1
China
China